Fernando Martín García is a Puerto Rican politician and former senator. He was a member of the Senate of Puerto Rico from 1989 to 1993, and then from 2000 to 2004.

Early years and studies

Fernando Martín García finished his elementary and high school at the Colegio San Ignacio de Loyola in San Juan. He then studied at the University of Puerto Rico receiving his bachelor's degree with a major in history in 1969. He then completed his master's degree in public policy from the John F. Kennedy School of Government and his Juris Doctor from Harvard Law School in 1974.

Since 1975, Martín García has worked as a professor of administrative law and ethics responsibility at the University of Puerto Rico School of Law.

Political career

Martín García was candidate for Governor of Puerto Rico for the Puerto Rican Independence Party at the 1984 and 1992 general elections.

At the 1988 elections, Martín García was elected to the Senate of Puerto Rico for the first time. For the 1996 elections, he was a candidate for senator for the District of San Juan, but lost.

Martín García was elected again to the senate at the 2000 general elections. After that term, he ran for mayor of San Juan, but lost to incumbent Jorge Santini.

International presence and support for independence

Martín García has been a supporter of Puerto Rican independence for a long time. He has defended his position in international forums like the  United Nations, the Permanent Conference of Political Parties for Latin America, the Latin American Association of Human Rights, and the Socialist International.

Martín García was also one of the lead protesters against the presence of the United States military during the Navy-Vieques protests. As a result, he was arrested for civil disobedience.

References

External links
Biografía Fernando Martín on Independencia.net

Members of the Senate of Puerto Rico
Living people
Harvard Kennedy School alumni
Puerto Rico Independence Party politicians
Year of birth missing (living people)
Colegio San Ignacio de Loyola alumni
Harvard Law School alumni
Puerto Rican independence activists